Evangelos or Evangelis Zappas ( or ; ; 23 August 1800 – 19 June 1865) was a Greek patriot, philanthropist and businessman who spent most of his life in Romania. He is recognized today as one of the founders of the modern Olympic Games, which were held in 1859, 1870, 1875, and 1888 and preceded the Olympic Games that came under the auspices of the International Olympic Committee. These Games, known at the time simply as Olympics, came before the founding of the International Olympic Committee itself. The legacy of Evangelis Zappas, as well as the legacy of his cousin Konstantinos Zappas, was also used to fund the Olympic Games of 1896.

During his youth, Zappas joined the Greek War of Independence (1821–1832), achieving the rank of Major and fighting in several significant battles. Following Greek independence, he moved to Wallachia where he had a successful career as a businessman, becoming one of the richest men of that time in Eastern Europe. Aside from being the only major sponsor of the Olympic revival at that time, Zappas's philanthropy also included contributions toward the foundation of several Greek institutions and schools as well as sports and exhibition facilities.

Biography

Early life, military career, and later career in Wallachia
Evangelis Zappas was one of three children born to Vasileios Zappas and Sotira Meksi, of Greek or Aromanian ancestry, on 23 August 1800 in the village of Labovo located near Tepelenë (modern Gjirokastër County, Albania) when the region was still under Ottoman rule. Zappas did not receive any education during his childhood. He left his village at the age of 13 and enrolled as a mercenary in the Ottoman militia of the local ruler Ali Pasha.

Zappas became a member of the Greek patriotic organization Filiki Eteria and joined his compatriots when the Greek War of Independence broke out in 1821. During this period, Zappas reached the rank of Major in the revolutionary army and became a personal friend of the Souliot captain, Markos Botsaris. After Botsaris's death in 1823, Zappas served under various military commanders of the independence struggle, such as Dimitrios Panourgias, Kitsos Tzavelas, and Michail Spyromilios. He participated in several major conflicts, such as the siege of Souli, the first siege of Missolonghi and the Battle of Peta. In his later correspondence with a Greek official, he claimed that he was wounded five times during the war.

In 1831, Zappas emigrated to Wallachia and made a fortune in land and agriculture. In the 1850s, Zappas was considered one of the wealthiest entrepreneurs in Eastern Europe. At the time of his death in 1865, his total wealth was estimated at six million gold drachmas.

Revival of the Olympic Games

The idea of reviving the ancient Olympic Games had been raised from time to time during the early and mid 19th century, inspired to a certain degree by romanticism and patriotism. In 1833, the romantic poet Panagiotis Soutsos, in his work Dialogue of the Dead, proposed the revival of the Games in the newly formed Greek state, as part of the revival of ancient Greek tradition. In 1852, archaeologist Ernst Curtius stated during a lecture that the Olympic events would be revived.

Zappas was notably inspired by Panagiotis Soutsos and resolved to revive this ancient tradition through his own efforts and resources. In early 1856, he sent a letter through diplomatic channels to King Otto of Greece, offering to fund the revival of the Olympic Games, and to provide cash prizes to the victors. However, this initiative was not without opposition. There was wide belief among some Greek politicians that athletic games were a throwback to ancient times, unsuited to the modern era. Alexandros Rizos Rangavis, the Greek foreign minister and head of the conservative anti-athletics lobby in Athens, suggested an industrial and agricultural exposition instead of an athletics event. For months there was no official answer from the Greek state. In July 1856, an article in the Greek press by Panagiotis Soutsos made Zappas's proposal widely known to the public and triggered a series of events. King Otto agreed to the organization of athletics competitions at four-year intervals, with Zappa's full sponsorship, to coincide with industrial and agricultural expositions. As a result, Zappas provided the Greek government with the necessary financial resources to establish an Olympic Trust Fund.

On 15 November 1859, the first Olympic Games was held in a city square in central Athens. These athletic contests were the first Olympic Games of modern times with the provenance of ancient Greek roots and the intention of using an, as yet unready, ancient Greek stadium. That stadium, the Panathenaic Stadium, was first used for a modern Olympic Games in 1870 and for the first time since the ancient Panathenaic and Olympic Games. The athletes competed in a variety of disciplines, similar to that of the ancient Olympic Games: running, discus, javelin throwing, wrestling, jumping, and pole climbing.

Zappas left a fortune for the funding of future Olympiads to be held at the Panathenian stadium. He died in 1865. His immense fortune was used for the construction of permanent sporting facilities in Athens, as well as for the continuation of the Olympiad. He also instructed on the building of the Zappeion exhibition and conference center, which is named in his honour and that of his cousin Konstantinos Zappas.

Legacy

Re-establishment of the Olympic Games in modern times

After Zappas's death, and wholly due to the Greek government ignoring Zappas's instructions to refurbish the stadium in marble, it was necessary to refurbish the Panathenian stadium a second time, replacing wood for marble, in readiness for the Athens 1896 Olympic Games. After a period of litigation over Zappas's bequests, his cousin Konstantinos Zappas continued and expanded his endowment of the Games and maintained efforts for the continuation of the Olympic concept. In 1870, the new stadium, with a spectator capacity of 30,000, was ready to host the second Olympiad. The Olympic Games of 1870, apart from being the first modern international Olympic Games to be hosted in a stadium, were better attended and hosted more events and athletes, and were much better organized in general. Additionally, the first modern Olympic building was built to support the contests (and hosted the fencing events of 1896), as well as an industrial exhibition that anti-athletic members of the Greek government had forced upon the concept of the Games. This building, located near the city's National Garden, was entirely funded by Zappas's legacy and was named Zappeion after him. The Zappeion officially opened on 20 October 1888.

Dr. William Penny Brookes, from the United Kingdom, further developed his Olympian Class sports events held in Much Wenlock in the 1850s, by adopting some events from the 1859 Athens Olympic Games into the programme of future Wenlock Olympian Games. Baron Pierre de Coubertin from Paris, France, was, in part, inspired by Dr. Brookes, and went on to found the International Olympic Committee in 1894.

Professor David C. Young, of the University of Florida (Gainesville), noted:
"Had it not been for Zappas, the Athens Games of 1896 surely would not have taken place. Zappas's actions, his will and the previous tradition of Zappas Olympic Games had made [Crown Prince] Constantine [of Greece] an advocate of Olympic Games before the formation of the IOC in 1894."

Philanthropy
Through his philanthropic activity, Zappas contributed to the national awakening of the Greeks, Romanians and Albanians. Apart from his efforts to revive the Olympics, Evangelos Zappas made several philanthropic donations towards the foundation of schools, libraries and other similar institutions all over the Ottoman-occupied world, and notably their birthplace, Epirus. Greek schools were founded and expanded in several Greek-populated villages and towns, such as Labovo, Lekli, Nivani, Dhroviani, Filiates, Delvina, Përmet. In Constantinople, education facilities were also founded that included nurseries, primary and secondary schools, which were collectively known as the Zappeion Institute. Moreover, a large amount of money was deposited in the National Bank of Greece to provide scholarships for Greek agricultural students in order to conduct postgraduate studies in Western Europe.

During the anti-Greek Istanbul Pogrom in 1955, the facilities of the Zappeion female college in the Turkish capital were vandalized by the fanatical mob and a statue of him was broken into pieces.

In addition to donations to the Greek state, Zappas was also a financier of the Romanian Academy where he has a statue there today. Zappas was an ardent Greek nationalist influenced by the writings of Panagiotis Soutsos, a 19th-century Greek poet. Among academic projects funded by him were a new synthesis on the history of the Romanians and a Romanian dictionary. He also funded a newspaper and books in the Albanian language in Romania. In this context, Zappas adopted multiple identities related to his birthplace (Albania), ethnic origin (Greek), and his adopted country (Romania).

Personality and resting place

Evangelis Zappas was often described as a solitary and eccentric personality, who had no children. On the other hand, he was a man of vision, determination and a patriot, who was well aware of the magnitude of his acts. His cousin, Konstantinos Zappas, was the executor of his will and he continued Evangelis Zappas philanthropic works through his legacy. Zappas's wish was to be initially buried in Romania, where he lived most of his life. But after four years his bones were exhumed and reinterred at the school's courtyard in Labovo where he was born, and his skull was enshrined beneath his memorial statue outside the Zappeion in Athens, Greece. A ceremony for the interment was held at 10am on 20 October 1888 at the Zappeion. Baron Pierre de Coubertin made a similar gesture by having his heart buried at Olympia. In the virtually unpopulated Labovo, there is an old, yet legible, tombstone that states in Albanian: "Here lie the bones of the philanthropist Evangelis Zappas".

See also
Manthos and Georgios Rizaris
Georgios Sinas
Petros Zappas
Simon Sinas
Zosimades

References

Citations

Sources

Further reading

External links
University of Florida (Gainesville) - Professor David C. Young Lifetime Achievement Award (includes long list of useful source references concerning the revival of the Olympic Games in modern times)
Testaments of Evangelis and Konstantinos Zappas. (Greek)

1800 births
1865 deaths
People from Gjirokastër
Founders of the modern Olympic Games
Greek philanthropists
Greek people of the Greek War of Independence
Greek revolutionaries
Members of the Filiki Eteria
Greek businesspeople
Romanian people of Aromanian descent
Romanian people of Greek descent
Greek emigrants to Romania
Greek people of Aromanian descent
Aromanians from the Ottoman Empire
People from the Ottoman Empire of Greek descent